The British School Warsaw is an international school in Warsaw, Poland. It was established in 1992 and currently has over 1000 students with 60 different nationalities.  The British School, Warsaw is part of Nord Anglia Education Group. The teaching staff are primarily UK trained. The British School Warsaw offers education to students aged 2 ½ to 18 years. The school follows the International Primary Curriculum (IPC), adapted to the needs of the international student community, from Early Years through to Primary and follows the English National Curriculum in the Secondary Key Stages, the IGCSE examinations and a well established International Baccalaureate (IB) Diploma Programme.

Campus 
The British School Warsaw is located on two sites close to Warsaw city center.

Early Years Campus is located in Stary Mokotów district at ul. Dabrowskiego 84, and caters for children from age 2 ½ to 6.

Main Campus  - hosting Primary, Secondary School and IB College students (for students from 6 years up to age 18 ) - is located at ul. Limanowskiego 15 in Warsaw’s  Sadyba district. {
  "type": "FeatureCollection",
  "features": [
    {
      "type": "Feature",
      "properties": {},
      "geometry": {
        "type": "Point",
        "coordinates": [
          21.055667074397,
          52.189151435148
        ]
      }
    }
  ]
}

Facilities

Early Years Centre 
The British School Early Years Centre is designed around a central hall, with classes grouped by age. There is a gymnasium hall and a separate music room.  The class teachers are supported by a specialist English Learning Support teacher as well as a Learning Support Teacher.  The outdoor facilities of the school include play equipment.

Main campus 
The British School main site offers facilities including: Primary and Secondary Libraries; IB Learning Centre for senior students; indoor and outdoor play facilities; sports halls; art rooms; music technology suite, music rooms and practice rooms; science laboratories and ICT suites and mobile computer facilities, linked to a wireless (wi-fi) system across the school. Each subject of the secondary school and International Baccalaureate curriculum has its own base, with Subject Zones replacing the Year Zones of the Primary school.
Students can extend their learning through Firefly, an on-line learning community.  They can access the Global Classroom.

Education 
The British School Warsaw provides education at primary and secondary level and is accredited by and affiliated with educational organizations such as COBIS - Council of British International Schools, IB - International Baccalaureate Organization, CAIE - Cambridge Assessment International Education, IPC - International Primary Curriculum, Pearson Edexcel, ABRSM, Rockschool International Music Exam Board, The Duke of Edinburgh's Award.

References

External links

Official website

International schools in Warsaw
International Baccalaureate schools in Poland
Educational institutions established in 1992
Warsaw
Nord Anglia Education
1992 establishments in Poland